Abberton may refer to:

People
Abberton (surname)

Places
Abberton, Essex, village in England
Abberton Reservoir, reservoir in Essex, England
Abberton, Worcestershire, village in England